In general, a Vietnamese pronoun 

 
(or )
can serve as a noun phrase. In Vietnamese, a pronoun usually connotes a degree of family relationship or kinship. In polite speech, the aspect of kinship terminology is used when referring to oneself, the audience, or a third party. These terms may vary by region. Many are derived from Chinese loanwords but have acquired the additional grammatical function of being pronouns.

Vietnamese terms of reference can reveal the social relationship between the speaker and the person being referred to, differences in age, and even the attitude of the speaker toward that person. Thus a speaker must carefully assess these factors to decide the appropriate term. Strangers may ask each other about age when they first meet to establish proper terms of address. If the speaker does not know the listener, there is a certain pronoun that they can address the speaker in order to sound respectful.

True pronouns
True pronouns are categorized into two classes depending on if they can be preceded by the plural marker chúng, bọn or các. Like other Asian pronominal systems, Vietnamese pronouns indicate the social status between speakers and others in the conversation in addition to grammatical person and number.

The table below shows the first class of pronouns that can be preceded by pluralizer. The parenthetical information next to these pronoun forms indicates information about the social status between the speaker and another person (or persons). Thus, "inferior to superior" indicates that the speaker is in an inferior or lower social status with respect another person (such as the hearer) who is in a superior or higher social status. The label "familiar" indicates that the speaker and another person are in a closer relationship such as between family members or between close friends. The label "intimate" refers to a very close relationship such as that between spouses or lovers.

The first person tôi is the only pronoun that can be used in polite speech. The first person ta is often used when talking to oneself as in a soliloquy, but also indicates a higher status of the speaker (such as that of a high official, etc.). The other superior-to-inferior forms in the first and second persons (tao, mày, mi, bay) are commonly used in familiar social contexts, such as among family members (e.g. older sister to younger sister, etc.).  These forms are otherwise considered impolite, and various forms of pronoun avoidance such as using kinship terms are used instead. The third person form nó (used to refer to animals, children, and scorned adults, such as criminals) is considerably less arrogant than the second person forms tao, mày, mi, bay. The pronoun mình is used only in intimate relationships, such as between spouses.

The pronominal forms in the table above can be modified with  chúng as in chúng mày, chúng nó. Exclusive/inclusive plural distinctions exist in the first person: chúng tôi and chúng tao are exclusive (i.e., me and them but not you), chúng ta and chúng mình are inclusive (i.e., you and me). Some of the forms (ta, mình, bay) can be used to refer to a plural referent, resulting in pairs with overlapping reference (e.g., both ta and chúng ta mean "inclusive we").

The other class of pronouns are known as "absolute" pronouns. These cannot be modified with the pluralizer chúng. Many of these forms are literary and archaic, particularly in the first and second person.

Unlike the first type of pronoun, these absolute third person forms (y, hắn, va) refer only to animate referents (typically people). The form y can be preceded by the pluralizer in southern dialects in which case it is more respectful than nó. The absolute pronoun người ta has a wider range of reference as "they, people in general, (generic) one, we, someone".

Kinship terms
Kinship terms are the most popular ways to refer to oneself and others. Anyone can be referred to using kinship terms, not just the speaker's relatives. The Vietnamese kinship terms are quite complex. While there is some flexibility as to which kinship terms should be used for people not related to the speaker, often only one term applies to people related by blood or marriage, for up to three generations. Some kinship terms are:

{| class="wikitable"
! Term !! Reciprocal !! Literal meaning !! Non-kinship usage || Note
|-
| cha || con || father || a priest || May sound too literary for contemporary use. Preferred in literary contexts (folkloric tales, myths, proverbs, etc.), although have been found in certain contemporary television dramas set in modern times. Many other terms are preferred in actual use, depending on the dialect: ba, bố, tía, thầy. Archaic: bác, áng.
|-
| thầy || con || father || a male teacher || Only the "male teacher" sense is universal. The "father" sense is only dialectal in the north.
|-
| mẹ || con || mother || || mẹ is the Northern form, má the Southern. Many other terms are used, depending on the dialect: u, bầm, mạ, má. Archaic: nạ.
|-
|anh || em || older brother || a non-elderly man; a man who's a little older, like one's own "big brother"; can be used as a romantic term of endearment||
|-
|chị || em || older sister || a non-elderly woman; a woman who's a little older, like one's own "big sister"; can be used as a romantic term of endearment||
|-
|em || anh or chị || younger sibling || a person who's a little younger, like one's own "little sibling"; a student; can be used as a romantic term of endearment||
|-
|con || cha, mẹ, bà, etc. || biological child or grandchild || a much younger person, usually in southern use ||
|-
|cháu || ông, bà, bác, chú, etc. || grandchild; niece; nephew || a much younger person, usually in northern use ||
|-
|chắt || cụ || great-grandchild || ||
|-
| ông || cháu or con || grandfather || an old man; formally, a middle-aged man || Paternal and maternal grandfathers are differentiated as ông nội (paternal grandfather) and ông ngoại (maternal grandfather), respectively. Nội (literally "inside") and ngoại (literally "outside", from the Chinese prefix for maternal relatives) are also used for short in the south.
|-
| bà || cháu or con || grandmother || an old woman; formally, a middle-aged woman || Paternal and maternal grandmothers are differentiated as bà nội (paternal grandmother) and bà ngoại (maternal grandmother), respectively. Nội (literally "inside") and ngoại (literally "outside", from the Chinese prefix for maternal relatives) are also used for short in the south.
|-
|cô || cháu || father's older or younger sister || a female teacher; a woman who's a little younger than one's parent, like their "little sister"; a young adult woman || Northern dialects from the turn of the 20th century, literal meaning is restricted to father's younger sister; dialectally also o. When paired with chú, always precedes it, as in cô chú.
|-
|chú || cháu || father's younger brother; thíms husband || a man who's a little younger than one's parent, like their "little brother" || in some dialects, literal meaning is restricted to father's younger brother
|-
|thím || cháu || chú'''s wife || informally, an effeminate man || dialectally also mợ or mự|-
|bác || cháu || a father older brother and his spouse || a person who's a little older than one's parents || Northern dialects from the turn of the 20th century, can also refer to father's elder brother or sister or mother's elder brother or sister; like em, modified by trai (male) or gái (female)
|-
|dì || cháu || mother's older or younger sister; stepmother || || Northern dialects from the turn of the 20th century, literal meaning is restricted to mother's younger sister|-
|cậu || cháu || mother's older or younger brother || || Northern dialects from the turn of the 20th century, literal meaning is restricted to mother's younger brother|-
|cậu || tớ || friend || ||
|-
|mợ || cháu || cậus wife || || in some dialects, used by the husband to refer to his wife, children to refer to mother, or parents-in-law to refer to a daughter-in-law
|-
|dượng || cháu || the husband of cô or dì; stepfather |||| dialectally also trượng|-
|cụ/cố || cháu || great-grandparent || a very old person ||
|-
|sơ || cháu || great-great-grandparent || ||
|-
|họ || || either the paternal or maternal extended family || they || third person plural
|}

Except the terms for "father", "mother" and "child", all others, such as "elder brother", "elder sister", "younger sibling", "uncle", "aunt", "nephew/niece/grandchild", etc. are usable for cousins, and cousinship is inherited from older generations and through marriage. In this regard, grandparents, aunts and uncles, nieces and nephews, etc. are a kind of closer "cousins" to the speaker; the further a relative is, the further back the speaker has to trace in to know exactly if they should use "grandpa", "grandma", "uncle", "aunt", etc. Distant cousins with "grandparent status" that are younger than the speaker may be referred to as ông/bà trẻ ("young grandpa/ma"). This phenomenon is highlighted in a Vietnamese proverb: Bé bằng củ khoai, cứ vai mà gọi (Small as a potato, but call by rank). In practice, age differences are commonplace, and some people may be hesitant to take advantage of their superior cousin status.

Despite this complicated system of kinship, when talking about cousins, even most Vietnamese are only concerned about anh họ, chị họ or em họ. Whether someone is "elder brother", "elder sister" or "younger sibling" depends on their relation to the speaker's parent's: for example, if the addressee is the younger brother of the speaker's mother's, his children are also always the speaker's "younger siblings" regardless of the ages of those cousins. If the speaker is married, they also inherit their spouse's cousinship, which means they will become an "older brother" or "older sister" regardless of their "younger sibling" cousins' ages.

Outside of actual kinship, kinship terms are used depending on age differences, in informal contexts, or in a friendly way toward children. When addressing a stranger, the speaker may have to consider whether this person is a bit or a lot older or younger than themself or their parents. This could be done by asking and knowing their age, or simply through guesswork. If the speaker is rather young and talking to a very old person, the speaker generally defaults to ông or bà for the addressee and cháu or con for themself. In formal contexts, however, only a few terms can be used based on how young or old the stranger appears: anh (young or middle-aged men), chị or cô (young or middle-aged women), ông (old men) and bà (old women); the reciprocal term would be the true pronoun tôi. For rather young people in their early twenties, the non-kinship term bạn ("friend") is also a recognized usage.

Singular kinship terms can be pluralized using the plural marker các, as in các anh. When speaking to an audience in a formal context, kinship terms are often strung together to cover common individual relationships: các anh chị em refers to an audience of roughly the same age, while các ông bà anh chị em, sometimes abbreviated ÔBACE, refers to an audience of all ages.

Non-kinship terms used as pronouns
In Vietnamese, virtually any noun used for a person can be used as a pronoun. These terms usually has only one grammatical person meaning and unlike kinship terms, do not serve multiple roles. Words such as "doctor", "teacher", "owner", etc. can be used as a second-person personal pronoun when needed. When referring to themselves, Vietnamese speakers, like speakers of Chinese, Japanese, and Korean languages, tend to deprecate their position while elevating the audience. While many of these terms are obsolete, some remain in widespread usage. The most prominent is tôi, literally meaning "servant". It is used as a fairly neutral term for "I" (neither very friendly, nor very formal). Tớ, also meaning "servant", is also popular among young people to refer to themselves with close friends (used in conjunction with cậu for "lad").

Pronouns that elevate the audience still in use include quý khách (valued customer), quý vị (valued higher being). Bạn (friend) is also popular among young people as a way of addressing each other.

Vietnamese speakers also refer to themselves and others by name, eliminating the need for personal pronouns altogether. For example:
An: Bình đang làm gì vậy?
Bình: Bình đang gọi Chính. An có biết Chính ở đâu không?
An: Không, An không biết Chính ở đâu hết.

Directly translated into English, the conversation would run thus:
An: What is Bình doing?
Bình: Bình is calling Chính. Does An know where Chính is?
An: No, An doesn't know where Chính is.

A normal translation of the conversation into English would be:
An: What are you doing?
Bình: I'm calling Chính. Do you know where he is?
An: No, I don't know where he is.

While always referring to oneself or the audience by name would be considered strange in English, in Vietnamese it is considered friendly and slightly respectful, especially between acquaintances of different genders who are not very close (as to use even more familiar terms such as tao, mày), or between young girls. Referring to oneself by name is also the preferred way used by music artists, or even actors, models, etc. However, in a kinship context, people with a lower rank cannot address their superiors by name.

Obsolete pronouns

With the abolishment of the monarchy, some pronouns, such as the royal we trẫm and others related to royalty, have fallen out of use and are no longer applicable. Archaic pronouns include:trẫm – used by the monarch to refer to themself, adopted like the Japanese chin from its use by the Chinese emperors following the example of Shi Huangdikhanh – used by the monarch to address a favored subjectbệ hạ – used by subjects when addressing the monarch; compare English "your majesty"thị – she

Pairs
With the exception of tôi, pronouns typically go hand-in-hand with another: when one is used to refer to the speaker, the other must be used to refer to the audience.

See also
Vietnamese name
Vietnamese alphabet
Vietnamese language
Sino-Vietnamese vocabulary
Thai honorifics#Personal pronouns

Notes

References
Alves, Mark J. 1997. "Problems in the European Linguistic Analyses of Southeast Asian Languages". Explorations in Southeast Asian Studies.
Alves, Mark J. 2007. "Sino-Vietnamese Grammatical Borrowing: An Overview." in Grammatical Borrowing in Cross-Linguistic Perspective, 343-362. New York: Mouton de Gruyter, ed. Yaron Matras and Jeanette Sakel.
Alves, Mark J. 2009. "Sino-Vietnamese Grammatical Vocabulary Sociolinguistic Conditions for Borrowing" in Journal of the Southeast Asian Linguistics Society, Volume 1, 1-9 PDF
Ngo, Thanh.  "Translation of Vietnamese Terms of Address and Reference". Translation Journal'', 2006.

External links
In the Fullness of Time
Code-Switching of Personal Pronouns in Vietnamese-English bilingual speakers

Vietnamese language
Pronouns by language
Vietnamese grammar